In mathematics a Steinberg symbol is a pairing function which generalises the Hilbert symbol and plays a role in the algebraic K-theory of fields.  It is named after mathematician Robert Steinberg.

For a field F we define a Steinberg symbol (or simply a symbol) to be a function
, where G is an abelian group, written multiplicatively, such that
  is bimultiplicative;
 if  then .

Properties
If (⋅,⋅) is a symbol then (assuming all terms are defined)
 ;
 ;
  is an element of order 1 or 2;
 .

Examples
 The trivial symbol which is identically 1.
 The Hilbert symbol on F with values in {±1} defined by

The Contou-Carrère symbol is a symbol for the ring of Laurent power series over an Artinian ring.

Continuous symbols
If F is a topological field then a symbol c is weakly continuous if for each y in F∗ the set of x in F∗ such that c(x,y) = 1 is closed in F∗.  This makes no reference to a topology on the codomain G.  If G is a topological group, then one may speak of a continuous symbol, and when G is Hausdorff then a continuous symbol is weakly continuous.

The only weakly continuous symbols on R are the trivial symbol and the Hilbert symbol: the only weakly continuous symbol on C is the trivial symbol.  The characterisation of weakly continuous symbols on a non-Archimedean local field F was obtained by Moore.  The group K2(F) is the direct sum of a cyclic group of order m and a divisible group K2(F)m.  A symbol on F lifts to a homomorphism on K2(F) and is weakly continuous precisely when it annihilates the divisible component K2(F)m.  It follows that every weakly continuous symbol factors through the norm residue symbol.

See also
 Steinberg group (K-theory)

References

External links
Steinberg symbol at the Encyclopaedia of Mathematics

K-theory